Na'aran, formerly known as Niran is an Israeli settlement organized as a kibbutz in the West Bank. Located in Area C of the Jordan Valley near Jericho, it falls under the jurisdiction of Bik'at HaYarden Regional Council.

The international community considers Israeli settlements in the West Bank illegal under international law, but the Israeli government disputes this.

Etymology
The settlement was originally named Niran after the biblical city of Naaran. In 2018 it was renamed Na'aran.

History
The settlement was established on 18 June 1971 under the name Niran as a Nahal settlement by the Nahal Command in collaboration with the Agricultural Settlement Department of the Jewish Agency on land prepared by the Jewish National Fund. According to ARIJ, Israel confiscated 497 dunams of land from the Palestinian village of Al-Auja in order to construct the settlement. Niran began its existence as "a tented outpost of a few dozen persons." The barren conditions required that soil be carried up from surrounding valleys to make agriculture viable. During its time as a military outpost, it was used to prevent armed infiltration from Jordan and as a disciplinary assignment for delinquent Israeli soldiers. It was demilitarized and converted to a civilian kibbutz in 1977.

Culture
The kibbutz organizes workshops on Zionism, Judaism and Israeli society. Some members of the kibbutz work in the date groves or at the local plastics factory, P.V.Ran, which manufactures packaging and wrappings for food products in compliance with international standards.

Archaeological findings
The ruins of a 6th-century synagogue were discovered in Naaran, a short distance from the kibbutz. The site contains an ancient mosaic and archeological treasures and attracts both worshippers and pilgrims. In May 2012, the ancient synagogue was vandalized with graffiti that included swastikas and Palestinian flags.

References

External links
Kibbutz website 

Kibbutzim
Kibbutz Movement
Nahal settlements
Israeli settlements in the West Bank
Populated places established in 1971
1971 establishments in the Israeli Military Governorate